Caninabis is a 1979 Canadian animated short film by Kaj Pindal.

Summary
It explores a dog's addiction to marijuana while having a brilliant career on the drug squad only to mistaken a farm fertilizer for weed, causing an un-called "bust".

Accolades
1980: Canadian Screen Award for Best Animated Short (nominated)

References

External links
NFB
IMDB

1979 animated films
National Film Board of Canada animated short films
1979 films
1970s animated short films
Films directed by Kaj Pindal
Canadian films about cannabis
Animated films without speech
Animated films about dogs
1970s Canadian films
Films about smoking